Cone of silence may refer to:

Fictional devices
 Cone of silence (Dune), a fictional device used for privacy in the 1965 novel Dune
 Cone of Silence (Get Smart), a fictional device from the 1960s American television comedy series Get Smart
 In the 1956 Arthur C. Clarke novel The City and the Stars the Central Computer creates a cone of silence to telepathically isolate Alvin and the robot.

Literature and film
 Cone of Silence, 1959 novel by Arthur David Beaty
 Cone of Silence (film), a 1960 British aviation drama based on the novel
 The Cone of Silence, a booklet of poetry written by British-Canadian poet Todd Swift (born 1966)

Science
 Cone of silence (navigation), an element of aircraft navigation in the 1930s and 1940s
 Cone of silence (radar), the area unable to be "seen" by a radar antenna

Other
 "The Cone of Silence", a song on the 1986 Yo La Tengo album Ride the Tiger